James Needs (17 October 1919 – 4 February 2003) was a British film editor associated with his work at Hammer Film Productions.

Selected filmography
 Snowbound (1948)
 The Bad Lord Byron (1949)
 A Boy, a Girl and a Bike (1949)
 Room to Let (1950)
 A Case for PC 49 (1951)
 To Have and to Hold (1951)
 Whispering Smith Hits London (1952)
 Wings of Danger (1952)
 Lady in the Fog (1952)
 Girdle of Gold (1952)
 The Flanagan Boy (1953)
 The House Across the Lake (1954)
 The Men of Sherwood Forest (1954)
 The Glass Cage (1955)
 The Quatermass Xperiment (1955)
 X the Unknown (1956)
 The Curse of Frankenstein (1957)
 The Snorkel (1957)
 Quatermass 2 (1957)
 The Mummy (1959)
 A Weekend with Lulu (1961)
 The Witches (1966)
 Dr. Jekyll and Sister Hyde (1971)

References

External links
 

1919 births
2003 deaths
British film editors